Vatakara railway station (Code:BDJ), alternatively known as Badagara railway station is a major railway station serving the City of Vatakara, Kerala. It lies in the Shoranur–Mangalore section of the Southern Railways. The station has 3 platforms and 3 tracks. Although no trains originate from this station, most of the important trains passing through stop here. Trains halting at the station connect the town to prominent cities in India such as Thiruvananthapuram, Kochi, Chennai, Mumbai, Bangalore, Kozhikode, Coimbatore, Hyderabad, Ahmedabad, New Delhi, Mangalore, Kolkata and so forth. This station has now been upgraded to a Model railway station (adarsh).

Facilities
 Online reservation counters 
 Retirement rooms 
 Parcel booking office
 Railway Mailing Service (RMS) office
 Refreshment stalls and book stalls 
 Pre-paid parking 
 State Bank ATM
 Railway information counter
 Cell phone recharge stalls
 RPF Out Post
 Railwire wifi
 Lifts
 Escalator

Upcoming facilities
 Second foot overbridge on the north side of the platform.

Gallery

References

Railway stations in Kozhikode district
Palakkad railway division